The 2014 Malaysian motorcycle Grand Prix was the seventeenth round of the 2014 Grand Prix motorcycle racing season. It was held at the Sepang International Circuit in Sepang on 26 October 2014.

Details
The podium was completed by the two Movistar Yamaha riders; Valentino Rossi finished in second place and Jorge Lorenzo finished in third place. Márquez's result was also good enough for Honda to claim the manufacturers' championship, with a race to spare. Dani Pedrosa was also in contention during the race, but suffered two crashes and had to retire from the race. The result sealed fourth place in the championship for Pedrosa. Andrea Iannone did innot competed this race due to being injured in a crash during a practice session. Pol Espargaró also crashed during a free practice session, setting his bike aflame.

In the Moto2 category, a third-place finish for Esteve Rabat was enough for the Marc VDS Racing Team rider to clinch the Moto2 world championship with a race to spare. Rabat had started the race from pole position, but eventually trailed his title rivals Maverick Viñales and Mika Kallio home. It was Viñales' third victory in four races, and ensured that the battle for the runner-up placing in the championship would go down to the final race in Valencia; Kallio held the advantage by 15 points over Viñales.

In Moto3, Efrén Vázquez took his second victory of the season – and of his career – ahead of Jack Miller and Álex Rins. Championship leader Álex Márquez finished only fifth, reducing his championship lead over Miller to eleven points. Post-race, Marquez's Estrella Galicia 0,0 team protested the results and the riding manner of Miller, riding for the rival Ajo Motorsport team. Race directors ultimately decided that no further action was warranted.

Classification

MotoGP

Moto2

Moto3

Championship standings after the race (MotoGP)
Below are the standings for the top five riders and constructors after round seventeen concluded.

Riders' championship standings

Constructors' championship standings

 Note: Only the top five positions are included for both sets of standings.

References

2014 MotoGP race reports
Motorcycle Grand Prix
Malaysian motorcycle Grand Prix
Malaysian motorcycle Grand Prix